Gorji Sara (also Romanized as Gorjī Sarā; also known as Gach Sarā) is a village in Kelarabad Rural District, Kelarabad District, Abbasabad County, Mazandaran Province, Iran. At the 2006 census, its population was 251, in 75 families.

References 

Populated places in Abbasabad County